Jonny Greenwood Is the Controller is a compilation album created by Radiohead guitarist Jonny Greenwood and released on Trojan Records. Released to commemorate Trojan Records' 40th anniversary, it collects Greenwood's favorite reggae and dub Trojan tracks, from artists including Lee "Scratch" Perry, Joe Gibbs, and Linval Thompson. The title references Thompson's track "Dread Are the Controller".

The album features artwork by Radiohead artist Stanley Donwood. It received positive reviews from critics.

Track listing
"Dread Are the Controller" – Linval Thompson
"Let Me Down Easy" – Derrick Harriott
"I'm Still in Love (12" mix)" – Marcia Aitken
"Never Be Ungrateful (12" mix)" – Gregory Isaacs
"Bionic Rats" – Lee "Scratch" Perry
"Cool Rasta" – The Heptones
"Flash Gordon Meets Luke Skywalker" – Scientist & Jammy & The Roots Radics
"Black Panta" – Lee "Scratch" Perry & The Upsetters
"Fever" – Junior Byles
"Beautiful and Dangerous" – Desmond Dekker & the Aces
"Dread Dub (It Dread Out Deh Version)" – Lloyd's All Stars
"Gypsy Man" – Marcia Griffiths
"A Ruffer Version" – Johnny Clarke & the Aggrovators
"Right Road to Dubland (Right Road to Zion Dub)" – The Jahlights
"Dreader Locks" – Junior Byles & Lee Perry
"This Life Makes Me Wonder" – Delroy Wilson
"Clean Race" – Scotty

References

2007 compilation albums
Radiohead
Dub albums
Sanctuary Records compilation albums
Works by Jonny Greenwood